Admiral Sir John Corbett  (15 July 1822 – 10 December 1893) was a Royal Navy officer who went on to be Commander-in-Chief, East Indies Station.

Naval career

Corbett joined the Royal Navy in 1835. Promoted to Commander in 1852, he served in the Second Opium War. Following his promotion to Captain in 1857, he commanded HMS Scout, HMS Hastings, HMS Black Prince and then the training ship HMS Britannia. In 1867 he commanded HMS Warrior. He was made Commander-in-Chief, East Indies Station in 1877 and Commander-in-Chief, The Nore in 1884. He retired in 1887.

In his spare time Corbett was an amateur artist who painted watercolours during his travels in the 1850s and 1860s.

Family
In 1864, he married Georgina Grace Holmes. Their son Admiral Charles Frederick Corbett also reached flag rank in the Royal Navy.

References

External links 
 

|-

1822 births
1893 deaths
Royal Navy admirals
Knights Commander of the Order of the Bath
Place of birth missing